Cambridge Park High School is located in Western Sydney, at the base of the Blue Mountains.
The school offers a comprehensive education to the approximately 600 students enrolled, who come primarily from the surrounding suburbs of Kingswood, Werrington, Werrington County, Cambridge Park and Cambridge Gardens.

Alumni
Tony Jones, Sports Journalist
Jamie Olejnik, Rugby league player

External links
School website

Public high schools in Sydney